Alvin Hall (born August 12, 1934) is a former American football player who played for Los Angeles Rams of the National Football League (NFL).

References

1934 births
Living people
Los Angeles Rams players
American football defensive backs
People from Fayette, Mississippi